Forgiveness, in a psychological sense, is the intentional and voluntary process by which one who may initially feel victimized or wronged, goes through a change in feelings and attitude regarding a given offender, and overcomes the impact of the offense including negative emotions such as resentment and a desire for vengeance (however justified it might be). Theorists differ, however, in the extent to which they believe forgiveness also implies replacing the negative emotions with positive attitudes (i.e. an increased ability to tolerate the offender). In certain legal contexts, forgiveness is a term for absolving or giving up all claims on account of debt, loan, obligation, or other claims.

On the psychological level, forgiveness is different from simple condoning (viewing an action as harmful, yet to be “forgiven” or overlooked for certain reasons of “charity”), excusing or pardoning (merely releasing the offender from responsibility for an action), or forgetting (attempting to somehow remove from one's conscious mind, the memory of a given “offense").  In some schools of thought, it involves a personal and "voluntary" effort at the self-transformation of one's own half of a relationship with another, such that one's own self is restored to peace and ideally to what psychologist Carl Rogers has referred to as “unconditional positive regard” towards the other.

As a psychological concept and virtue, the benefits of forgiveness have been explored in religious thought, social sciences and medicine. Forgiveness may be considered simply in terms of the person who forgives including forgiving themselves. This can be in terms of the person forgiven or in terms of the relationship between the forgiver and the person forgiven. In most contexts, forgiveness is granted without any expectation of restorative justice, and without any response on the part of the offender (for example, one may forgive a person who is incommunicado or dead). In practical terms, it may be necessary for the offender to offer some form of acknowledgment, an apology, or even just ask for forgiveness, in order for the wronged person to believe themselves able to forgive as well.

Social and political dimensions of forgiveness involves the strictly private and religious sphere of "forgiveness". The notion of "forgiveness" is generally considered unusual in the political field. However, Hannah Arendt considers that the "faculty of forgiveness" has its place in public affairs. The philosopher believes that forgiveness can liberate resources both individually and collectively in the face of the irreparable. During an investigation in Rwanda on the discourses and practices of forgiveness after the 1994 genocide, sociologist Benoit Guillou illustrated the extreme polysemy (multiple meanings) of the word "forgiveness" but also the eminently political character of the notion. By way of conclusion of his work, the author proposes four main figures of forgiveness to better understand, on the one hand, ambiguous uses and, on the other hand, the conditions under which forgiveness can mediate a resumption of social link.

Most world religions include teachings on the nature of forgiveness, and many of these teachings provide an underlying basis for many varying modern day traditions and practices of forgiveness. Some religious doctrines or philosophies place greater emphasis on the need for humans to find some sort of divine forgiveness for their own shortcomings, others place greater emphasis on the need for humans to practice forgiveness of one another, yet others make little or no distinction between human and divine forgiveness.

The term forgiveness can be used interchangeably and is interpreted many different ways by people and cultures. This is specifically important in relational communication because forgiveness is a key component in communication and the overall progression as an individual and couple or group. When all parties have a mutual viewing for forgiveness then a relationship can be maintained. "Understanding antecedents of forgiveness, exploring the physiology of forgiveness, and training people to become more forgiving all imply that we have a shared meaning for the term".

Research 

Although there is presently no consensus for a psychological definition of forgiveness in research literature, agreement has emerged that forgiveness is a process, and a number of models describing the process of forgiveness have been published, including one from a radical behavioral perspective.

Dr. Robert Enright from the University of Wisconsin–Madison founded the International Forgiveness Institute and is considered the initiator of forgiveness studies. He developed a 20-Step Process Model of Forgiveness. Recent work has focused on what kind of person is more likely to be forgiving. A longitudinal study showed that people who were generally more neurotic, angry, and hostile in life were less likely to forgive another person even after a long time had passed. Specifically, these people were more likely to still avoid their transgressor and want to enact revenge upon them two and a half years after the transgression.

Studies show that people who forgive are happier and healthier than those who hold resentments. The first study to look at how forgiveness improves physical health discovered that when people think about forgiving an offender it leads to improved functioning in their cardiovascular and nervous systems. Another study at the University of Wisconsin found the more forgiving people were, the less they suffered from a wide range of illnesses. The less forgiving people reported a greater number of health problems.

The research of Dr. Fred Luskin of Stanford University, and author of the book Forgive for Good presented evidence that forgiveness can be learned (i.e. can be a teachable skill, with practice) based on research projects into the effects of teaching forgiveness: giving empirical validity to the concept that forgiveness is powerful as well as excellent for your health. In three separate studies, including one with Catholics and Protestants from Northern Ireland whose family members were murdered in the political violence, he found that people who are taught how to forgive become less angry, feel less hurt, are more optimistic, become more forgiving in a variety of situations, and become more compassionate and self-confident. His studies show a reduction in experience of stress, physical manifestations of stress, and an increase in vitality.

Ideas about what forgiveness is not 
 Forgiveness is not condoning
 Forgiveness is not forgetting
 Forgiveness is not excusing (i.e. making reasons to explain away offender's responsibility or free will)
 Forgiveness doesn't have to be religious or otherworldly
 Forgiveness is not minimizing your hurt
 Forgiveness is not reconciliation (i.e. reestablishing trust in the relationship)
 Forgiveness is not denying or suppressing anger; rather its focus is on resentment.—in particular, in order to forgive it is healthy to acknowledge and express negative emotions, before you can even forgive
 Forgiveness is not ignoring accountability or justice—in particular, punishment and recompensation are independent of the choice to forgive (you can forgive, or not forgive, and still pursue punishment and/or recompensation, regardless)
 Forgiveness is not pardoning; it cannot be granted or chosen by someone else
 Emotional forgiveness is not the same as decisional forgiveness or the expression of forgiveness. Expressing emotions (i.e., "I am angry at you" or "I forgive you") is not the same as genuinely having or experiencing the emotions (i.e., people can deny, mistake, or lie about their emotional experience to another person while genuinely feeling something else instead)
 Although heavily debated, emotional forgiveness is for you, not the offender (i.e., unless you choose to make it so: by expressing it, or by trying to reconcile)

The timeliness of forgiveness 
The psychologist Wanda Malcolm writes a chapter in Women's Reflections on the Complexities of Forgiveness titled "the Timeliness of Forgiveness Interventions" where she outlines reasons why forgiveness takes time: when work on self (care/healing) takes priority (i.e. therapy, medical injuries, etc.), when issues of relational safety need to be addressed, and where facilitating forgiveness may be premature immediately after an interpersonal offense. Malcolm explains that "premature efforts to facilitate forgiveness may be a sign of our reluctance to witness our client’s pain and suffering and may unwittingly reinforce the client’s belief that the pain and suffering is too much to bear and must be suppressed or avoided."

Worthington (et al.) observed that “anything done to promote forgiveness has little impact unless substantial time is spent at helping participants think through and emotionally experience their forgiveness”. Efforts to facilitate forgiveness may be premature immediately after an interpersonal injury, if not harmful.

Indeed, if you make forgiveness a goal, it remains elusive, like a carrot on a stick; just when you think you've got it, it's out of reach again. But when you focus on self-compassion and develop your core-values, forgiveness sneaks up on you. If you realize that you've forgiven your betrayer, it will be after the fact (of detachment or full emotional reinvestment), not before.

Religious views 

Religion can have an impact on how someone chooses to forgive and the process they go through. Most have conceptualized religion's effect in three ways—through religious activity, religious affiliation and teachings, and imitation. There are several thousand religions in the world and each one can look at forgiveness a different way.

Abrahamic

Judaism 

In Judaism, if a person causes harm, but then sincerely and honestly apologizes to the wronged individual and tries to rectify the wrong, the wronged individual is encouraged, but not required, to grant forgiveness:

 "It is forbidden to be obdurate and not allow yourself to be appeased. On the contrary, one should be easily pacified and find it difficult to become angry. When asked by an offender for forgiveness, one should forgive with a sincere mind and a willing spirit ... forgiveness is natural to the seed of Israel." (Mishneh Torah, Teshuvah 2:10)

In Judaism, one must go "to those he has harmed" in order to be entitled to forgiveness. [One who sincerely apologizes three times for a wrong committed against another has fulfilled their obligation to seek forgiveness. (Shulchan Aruch) OC 606:1] This means that in Judaism a person cannot obtain forgiveness from God for wrongs the person has done to other people. This also means that, unless the victim forgave the perpetrator before he died, murder is unforgivable in Judaism, and they will answer to God for it, though the victims' family and friends can forgive the murderer for the grief they caused them. The Tefila Zaka meditation, which is recited just before Yom Kippur, closes with the following:

 "I know that there is no one so righteous that they have not wronged another, financially or physically, through deed or speech. This pains my heart within me, because wrongs between humans and their fellow are not atoned by Yom Kippur, until the wronged one is appeased. Because of this, my heart breaks within me, and my bones tremble; for even the day of death does not atone for such sins. Therefore I prostrate and beg before You, to have mercy on me, and grant me grace, compassion, and mercy in Your eyes and in the eyes of all people. For behold, I forgive with a final and resolved forgiveness anyone who has wronged me, whether in person or property, even if they slandered me, or spread falsehoods against me. So I release anyone who has injured me either in person or in property, or has committed any manner of sin that one may commit against another [except for legally enforceable business obligations, and except for someone who has deliberately harmed me with the thought ‘I can harm him because he will forgive me']. Except for these two, I fully and finally forgive everyone; may no one be punished because of me. And just as I forgive everyone, so may You grant me grace in the eyes of others, that they too forgive me absolutely."

Thus the "reward" for forgiving others is not God's forgiveness for wrongs done to others, but rather help in obtaining forgiveness from the other person.

Sir Jonathan Sacks, chief rabbi of the United Hebrew Congregations of the Commonwealth, summarized: "it is not that God forgives, while human beings do not. To the contrary, we believe that just as only God can forgive sins against God, so only human beings can forgive sins against human beings."

Jews observe a Day of Atonement Yom Kippur on the day before God makes decisions regarding what will happen during the coming year. Just prior to Yom Kippur, Jews will ask forgiveness of those they have wronged during the prior year (if they have not already done so). During Yom Kippur itself, Jews fast and pray for God's forgiveness for the transgressions they have made against God in the prior year. Sincere repentance is required, and once again, God can only forgive one for the sins one has committed against God; this is why it is necessary for Jews also to seek the forgiveness of those people who they have wronged.

Christianity 

Forgiveness is central to Christian ethics and is a frequent topic in sermons and theological works, because Christianity is about Christ, Christ is about redemption, and redemption is about forgiveness of sin.

God's forgiveness
Unlike in Judaism, God can forgive sins committed by people against people, since he can forgive every sin except for the eternal sin, and forgiveness from one's victim is not necessary for salvation. The Parable of the Prodigal Son is perhaps the best known parable about forgiveness and refers to God's forgiveness for those who repent. Jesus asked for God's forgiveness of those who crucified him. "And Jesus said, 'Father, forgive them, for they know not what they do.'" – Luke 23:34

Forgiving others
Forgiving offenses is among the spiritual works of mercy, and forgiving others begets being forgiven by God. Considering Mark 11:25, and Matthew 6:14–15, that follows the Lord's Prayer, "For if you forgive men when they sin against you, your heavenly Father will also forgive you. But if you do not forgive men their sins, your Father will not forgive your sins," forgiveness is not an option to a Christian, rather one must forgive to be a Christian. Forgiveness in Christianity is a manifestation of submission to Christ and fellow believers.

In the New Testament, Jesus speaks of the importance of forgiving or showing mercy toward others. This is based on the belief that God forgives sins through faith in the atoning sacrifice of Jesus Christ in his death (1 John 2:2) and that, therefore, Christians should forgive others (Ephesians 4:32). Jesus used the parable of the unmerciful servant (Matthew 18:21–35) to show that His followers (represented in the parable by the servant) should forgive because God (represented by the king) forgives much more.

In the Sermon on the Mount, Jesus repeatedly spoke of forgiveness: "Blessed are the merciful, for they will be shown mercy." Matthew 5:7 (NIV) "Therefore, if you are offering your gift at the altar and there remember that your brother has something against you, leave your gift there in front of the altar. First go and be reconciled to your brother; then come and offer your gift." Matthew 5:23–24 (NIV) "And when you stand praying, if you hold anything against anyone, forgive him, so that your Father in heaven may forgive you your sins." Mark 11:25 (NIV) "But I tell you who hear me: Love your enemies, do good to those who hate you, bless those who curse you, pray for those who mistreat you. If someone strikes you on one cheek, turn to him the other also." Luke 6:27–29 (NIV) "Be merciful, just as your Father is merciful." Luke 6:36 (NIV) "Do not judge, and you will not be judged. Do not condemn, and you will not be condemned. Forgive, and you will be forgiven." Luke 6:37 (NIV)

Elsewhere, it is said "Then Peter came to Him and said, "Lord, how often shall my brother sin against me, and I forgive him? Up to seven times?" Jesus said to him, "I do not say to you, up to seven times, but up to seventy times seven." Matthew 18:21–22 (NKJV)

Benedict XVI, on a visit to Lebanon in 2012, insisted that peace must be based on mutual forgiveness: "Only forgiveness, given and received, can lay lasting foundations for reconciliation and universal peace".

Pope Francis during a General Audience explained forgiving others as God forgives oneself.

Islam 

Islam teaches that Allah is Al-Ghaffur "The Oft-Forgiving", and is the original source of all forgiveness (ghufran ). Seeking forgiveness from Allah with repentance is a virtue.

Islam recommends forgiveness, because Allah values forgiveness. There are numerous verses in Quran and the Hadiths recommending forgiveness. However, Islam also allows revenge to the extent harm done, but forgiveness is encouraged, with a promise of reward from Allah.

Afw (عفو is another term for forgiveness in Islam; it occurs 35 times in Quran, and in some Islamic theological studies, it is used interchangeably with ghufran. Afw means to pardon, to excuse for a fault or an offense. According to Muhammad Amanullah, forgiveness ('Afw) in Islam is derived from three wisdoms. First and the most important wisdom of forgiveness is that it is merciful when the victim or guardian of the victim accepts money instead of revenge. The second wisdom of forgiveness is that it increases honor and prestige of the one who forgives. Forgiveness is not a sign of weakness, humiliation or dishonor. Forgiveness is honor, raises the merit of the forgiver in the eyes of Allah, and enables a forgiver to enter paradise. The third wisdom of forgiveness is that according to some scholars, such as al-Tabari and al-Qurtubi, forgiveness expiates (kaffarah) the forgiver from the sins they may have committed at other occasions in life. Forgiveness is a form of charity (sadaqat). Forgiveness comes from taqwa (piety), a quality of God-fearing people.

Bahá'í Faith 
In the Bahá'í Writings, this explanation is given of how to be forgiving individuals toward others:
"Love the creatures for the sake of God and not for themselves. You will never become angry or impatient if you love them for the sake of God. Humanity is not perfect. There are imperfections in every human being, and you will always become unhappy if you look toward the people themselves. But if you look toward God, you will love them and be kind to them, for the world of God is the world of perfection and complete mercy. Therefore, do not look at the shortcomings of anybody; see with the sight of forgiveness."
 — `Abdu'l-Bahá, The Promulgation of Universal Peace, p. 92

Dharmic

Buddhism 
In Buddhism, forgiveness is seen as a practice to prevent harmful thoughts from causing havoc on one's mental well-being. Buddhism recognizes that feelings of hatred and ill-will leave a lasting effect on our mind karma. Instead, Buddhism encourages the cultivation of thoughts that leave a wholesome effect. "In contemplating the law of karma, we realize that it is not a matter of seeking revenge but of practicing mettā and forgiveness, for the victimizer is, truly, the most unfortunate of all." When resentments have already arisen, the Buddhist view is to calmly proceed to release them by going back to their roots. Buddhism centers on release from delusion and suffering through meditation and receiving insight into the nature of reality.
Buddhism questions the reality of the passions that make forgiveness necessary as well as the reality of the objects of those passions. "If we haven’t forgiven, we keep creating an identity around our pain, and that is what is reborn. That is what suffers."

Buddhism places much emphasis on the concepts of Mettā (loving kindness), karuna (compassion), mudita (sympathetic joy), and upekkhā (equanimity), as a means to avoiding resentments in the first place. These reflections are used to understand the context of suffering in the world, both our own and the suffering of others.

 "He abused me, he struck me, he overcame me, he robbed me’ — in those who harbor such thoughts hatred will never cease."
 "He abused me, he struck me, he overcame me, he robbed me’ — in those who do not harbor such thoughts hatred will cease."
 (Dhammapada 1.3–4; trans. Radhakrishnan – see article)

Hindu Dharma 

In Vedic literature and epics of Hinduism, Ksama or Kshyama (Sanskrit: क्षमा) and fusion words based on it, describe the concept of forgiveness. The word ksama is often combined with kripa (tenderness), daya (kindness) and karuna (करुणा, compassion) in Sanskrit texts. In Rg Veda, forgiveness is discussed in verses dedicated to deity Varuna, both the context of the one who has done wrong and one who is wronged. Forgiveness is considered one of the six cardinal virtues in Hindu Dharma.

The theological basis for forgiveness in Hindu Dharma is that a person who does not forgive carries a baggage of memories of the wrong, of negative feelings, of anger and unresolved emotions that affect their present as well as future. In Hindu Dharma, not only should one forgive others, but one must also seek forgiveness if one has wronged someone else. Forgiveness is to be sought from the individual wronged, as well as society at large, by acts of charity, purification, fasting, rituals and meditative introspection.

The concept of forgiveness is further refined in Hindu Dharma by rhetorically contrasting it in feminine and masculine form. In feminine form, one form of forgiveness is explained through Lakshmi (called Goddess Sri in some parts of India); the other form is explained in the masculine form through her husband Vishnu. Feminine Lakshmi forgives even when the one who does wrong does not repent. Masculine Vishnu, on the other hand, forgives only when the wrongdoer repents. In Hindu Dharma, the feminine forgiveness granted without repentance by Lakshmi is higher and more noble than the masculine forgiveness granted only after there is repentance. In the Hindu epic Ramayana, Sita – the wife of King Rama – is symbolically eulogized for forgiving a crow even as it harms her. Later in the epic Ramayana, she is eulogized again for forgiving those who harass her while she has been kidnapped in Lanka. Many other Hindu stories discuss forgiveness with or without repentance.

The concept of forgiveness is treated in extensive debates of Hindu literature. In some Hindu texts, certain sins and intentional acts are debated as naturally unforgivable; for example, murder and rape; these ancient scholars argue whether blanket forgiveness is morally justifiable in every circumstance, and whether forgiveness encourages crime, disrespect, social disorder and people not taking you seriously. Other ancient Hindu texts highlight that forgiveness is not same as reconciliation.

Forgiveness in Hindu Dharma does not necessarily require that one reconcile with the offender, nor does it rule out reconciliation in some situations. Instead forgiveness in Hindu philosophy is being compassionate, tender, kind and letting go of the harm or hurt caused by someone or something else. Forgiveness is essential for one to free oneself from negative thoughts, and being able to focus on blissfully living a moral and ethical life (dharmic life). In the highest self-realized state, forgiveness becomes the essence of one's personality, where the persecuted person remains unaffected, without agitation, without feeling like a victim, free from anger (akrodhi).

Other epics and ancient literature of Hindu Dharma discuss forgiveness. For example:

Jainism

In Jainism, forgiveness is one of the main virtues that needs to be cultivated by the Jains. Kṣamāpanā or supreme forgiveness forms part of one of the ten characteristics of dharma. In the Jain prayer, (pratikramana) Jains repeatedly seek forgiveness from various creatures—even from ekindriyas or single sensed beings like plants and microorganisms that they may have harmed while eating and doing routine activities. Forgiveness is asked by uttering the phrase, Micchāmi dukkaḍaṃ. Micchāmi dukkaḍaṃ is a Prakrit language phrase literally meaning "may all the evil that has been done be fruitless." During samvatsari—the last day of Jain festival paryusana—Jains utter the phrase Micchami Dukkadam after pratikraman. As a matter of ritual, they personally greet their friends and relatives micchāmi dukkaḍaṃ seeking their forgiveness. No private quarrel or dispute may be carried beyond samvatsari, and letters and telephone calls are made to the outstation friends and relatives asking their forgiveness.

Pratikraman also contains the following prayer:
Khāmemi savva-jīve savvë jive khamantu me / 

metti me savva-bhūesu, veraṃ mejjha na keṇavi //

(I ask pardon of all creatures, may all creatures pardon me.

May I have friendship with all beings and enmity with none.)

In their daily prayers and samayika, Jains recite Iryavahi sutra seeking forgiveness from all creatures while involved in routine activities:
May you, O Revered One! Voluntarily permit me. I would like to confess my sinful acts committed while walking. I honour your permission. I desire to absolve myself of the sinful acts by confessing them. I seek forgiveness from all those living beings which I may have tortured while walking, coming and going, treading on living organism, seeds, green grass, dew drops, ant hills, moss, live water, live earth, spider web and others. I seek forgiveness from all these living beings, be they — one sensed, two sensed, three sensed, four sensed or five sensed. Which I may have kicked, covered with dust, rubbed with ground, collided with other, turned upside down, tormented, frightened, shifted from one place to another or killed and deprived them of their lives. (By confessing) may I be absolved of all these sins.

Jain texts quote Māhavīra on forgiveness:
By practicing prāyaṣcitta (repentance), a soul gets rid of sins, and commits no transgressions; he who correctly practises prāyaṣcitta gains the road and the reward of the road, he wins the reward of good conduct. By begging forgiveness he obtains happiness of mind; thereby he acquires a kind disposition towards all kinds of living beings; by this kind disposition he obtains purity of character and freedom from fear.

— Māhavīra in  Uttarādhyayana Sūtra 29:17–18

Even the code of conduct amongst the monks requires the monks to ask forgiveness for all transgressions:
If among monks or nuns occurs a quarrel or dispute or dissension, the young monk should ask forgiveness of the superior, and the superior of the young monk. They should forgive and ask forgiveness, appease and be appeased, and converse without restraint. For him who is appeased, there will be success (in control); for him who is not appeased, there will be no success; therefore one should appease one's self. 'Why has this been said, Sir? Peace is the essence of monasticism'.

— Kalpa Sūtra 8:59

Other

Hoʻoponopono 
Hoʻoponopono is an ancient Hawaiian practice of reconciliation and forgiveness, combined with prayer. Similar forgiveness practices were performed on islands throughout the South Pacific, including Samoa, Tahiti and New Zealand. Traditionally Hoʻoponopono is practiced by healing priests or kahuna lapaʻau among family members of a person who is physically ill. Modern versions are performed within the family by a family elder, or by the individual alone.

Popular recognition 
The need to forgive is widely recognized by the public, but they are often at a loss for ways to accomplish it. For example, in a large representative sampling of American people on various religious topics in 1988, the Gallup Organization found that 94% said it was important to forgive, but 85% said they needed some outside help to be able to forgive. However, not even regular prayer was found to be effective.

Akin to forgiveness is mercy, so even if a person is not able to complete the forgiveness process they can still show mercy, especially when so many wrongs are done out of weakness rather than malice. The Gallup poll revealed that the only thing that was effective was "meditative prayer".

Forgiveness as a tool has been extensively used in restorative justice programs, after the abolition of apartheid Truth and Reconciliation Commission (South Africa), run for victims and perpetrators of Rwandan genocide, the violence in Israeli–Palestinian conflict, and Northern Ireland conflict, which has also been documented in film, Beyond Right and Wrong: Stories of Justice and Forgiveness (2012).

Forgiveness theory can be found and applied to religion, relationships, health, individual, interventions, and much more. Forgiveness is an important trait to understand and possess because it is something that everyone has to experience in their both personal and professional life.

Forgiveness is associated with the theory of emotion because it is largely drawn from a person's emotional connection and level with the situation. Forgiveness is something that most people are taught to understand and practice at a young age. Because forgiveness is an emotion there is not an exact originator of it but there are several theorists, psychologists, and sociologists who link it to other theories or apply theories to help understand the concept. The philosopher Joseph Butler (Fifteen Sermons) defined forgiveness as "overcoming of resentment, the overcoming of moral hatred, as a speech act, and as forbearance".

Forgiveness in relationships 

Forgiveness in marriage is an important aspect in a marriage. When two individuals are able to forgive each other it results in a long happy marriage. Forgiveness can help prevent problems from accruing in the married couple's future.

In a 2005 study, researchers were interested in figuring out whether forgiveness is important in a marriage. When does forgiveness usually accrue? Does it accrue before an argument or after an argument? Does forgiveness take a role when a person breaks a promise? etc. Researchers found six components that were related to forgiveness in marriage and explains how each one relates to forgiveness. The six components are: satisfaction, ambivalence, conflict, attributions, empathy and commitment.

Researchers provided an overview of forgiveness in marriage and how individuals in a relationship believe that if forgiveness accrues then you must forget what had happened. Moreover, based on the interventions and recommendations the researchers started to see how important forgiveness is in a relationship and how it can lead to a happy and healthy relationship.

In a 2005 study, researchers mentioned that when couples forgive their spouses they sometimes need help from professionals to overcome their pain that might be left behind. Researchers also described the difference between how each individual perceives the situation based on who is in pain and who caused the pain. Also how the couple react to the situation based on their feelings and how they personally respond to the situation.

The act and effects of forgiveness can vary depending on the relationship status between persons. Whether you are married, friends, or even just acquaintances, the process of forgiving is similar but not completely the same. When it comes to forgiving a friend,the friend's personal situation and feelings must also be considered. You must ask yourself if you were in the wrong or if the other person could already be going through some type of grief or suffering at the time of the incident. Consideration of other people's feelings plays a factor as to how much and how quickly a situation can be resolved.

The model of forgiveness:

"Enright's model of forgiveness has received empirical support and sees forgiveness as a journey through four phases" which are:

 Uncovering phase: Emphases on exploring the pain that the individual has experienced.
 Decision phase: The nature of forgiveness is discussed. Also the individual commits that they will try to forgive the spouse
 Work phase: The focus shifts to the transgressor in an effort to gain insight and understanding.
 Deepening phase': The victim moves toward resolution, becoming aware that he/she is not alone, having been the recipient of others' forgiveness, and finds meaning and purpose in the forgiveness process.

Furthermore, when married couples argue they tend to focus on who is right and who is wrong. Also couples tend to focus on who proves the other wrong which can cause more problems and can make the problem worse because it will make it harder to forgive one another.

Recommendation and interventions:

The researchers also came up with recommendation for practitioners and intervention to help individuals that are married on how to communicate with each other, how to resolve problems and how to make it easier to forgive each other.
Some of the interventions of forgiveness in marriage has been a great success. It encouraged forgiveness and made couples happier together.
 
Some of the recommendations that was given to practitioners was that the individuals had to explore and understand what forgiveness means before starting any intervention because the preconceived idea of forgiveness can cause problems with couples being open to forgive. For example, an individual not forgiving their spouse out of fear that the spouse might think that they are weak which can cause a conflict. It was stated that the couple must know the following:
 Forgiveness takes
 The different forms of forgiveness
 The danger in communicating in forgiveness
 That Perpetrators and victims have different perceptive context is important

Furthermore, the researchers thought of ways to further help married couples in the future and suggested that they should explore the following:
 The importance of seeking forgiveness
 Self-forgiveness
 The role of the sacred in marital forgiveness

Relationships are at the sentiment aspect of our lives; with our families at home and friends outside. Relationships interact in schools and universities, with work mates and, with colleagues at the workplace and in our diverse communities. In the article it states, the quality of these relationships determines our individual well-being, how well we learn, develop and function, our sense of connectedness with others and the health so society.

In 2002, two innovators of Positive Psychology, Ed Diener and Martin Seligman, conducted a study at the University of Illinois on the 10% of students with the highest scores recorded on a survey of personal happiness. What they came up with was most salient characteristics shared by students who were very content and showed positive life styles were the ones who "their strong ties to friends and family and commitment to spending time with them."

A study done in 2000, identified as a key study that taken part and examined two natures of relationships (friends and family) and at what age does the support switch importance from one to the other. The study showed that people whom had good family relationship were able to have more positive outside relationships with friends. Through the family relationship and friendships, the character of the individual was built to forgive and learn from the experience in the family.

In 2001, Charlotte vanOyen Witvliet asked people to think about someone who had hurt, wronged, or offended them. As they thought to answer, she observed their reaction. She observed their blood pressure, heart rate, facial muscle tension, and sweat gland activity. To deliberate on an old misdemeanor is to practice unforgiveness. The outcome to the recall of the grudge the candidates’ blood pressure and heart rate increased, and they sweated more. Pondering about their resents was stressful, and subjects found the rumination unpleasant. When they adept forgiveness, their physical stimulation glided downward. They showed no more of an anxiety reaction than normal wakefulness produces.

In 2013, study on self-forgiveness with spouse forgiveness has a better outcome to a healthier life by Pelucchi, Paleari, Regalia and Fincham. This study investigates self-forgiveness for real hurts committed against the partner in a romantic relationship (168 couples). For both males and females, the mistaken partners were more content with their romantic relationship to the extent that they had more positive and less negative sentiment and thoughts toward themselves. In the study when looking at the victimized partners were more gratified with the relationship when the offending partner had less negative sentiment and thoughts towards themselves. It concludes that self-forgiveness when in a relationship has positive impact on both the offending and victimized partner.

Forgiveness interventions 
Both negative and positive affect play a role in forgiveness interventions. It is the general consensus across researchers in the field of psychology, that the overarching purpose of forgiveness interventions is to decrease overall negative affect associated with the stimulus and increase the individual's positive affect.

The disease model has been mainly used in regards to therapy, however the incorporation of forgiveness into therapy has been lacking, and has been slowly gaining popularity in the last couple of decades. More recent research has shown how the growth of forgiveness in psychology has given rise to the study of forgiveness interventions.

Different types 
There are various forms of forgiveness interventions. One common adaptation used by researchers is where patients are forced to confront the entity preventing them from forgiving by using introspective techniques and expressing this to the therapist. Another popular forgiveness intervention is getting individual to try to see things from the offender's point of view. The end goal for this adaptation is getting the individual to perhaps understand the reasoning behind the offender's actions. If they are able to do this then they might be able to forgive the offender more easily. 
Over the past years, there have been researchers who have studied forgiveness interventions in relationships and whether or not prayer increases forgiveness. A study conducted in 2009 found that simply just by praying for a friend or thinking positive thoughts about that individual every day for four weeks demonstrates how prayer positively boosts the chances of forgiving a friend or partner which leads to a better relationship.

There is, however, conflicting evidence on the effectiveness of forgiveness interventions.

Contrary evidence 
Although research has taken into account the positive aspects of forgiveness interventions, there are also negative aspects that have been explored as well. Some researchers have taken a critical approach and have been less accepting of the forgiveness intervention approach to therapy.

Critics have argued that forgiveness interventions may actually cause an increase in negative affect because it is trying to inhibit the individual's own personal feelings towards the offender. This can result in the individual feeling negatively towards themself. This approach is categorizing the individual's feelings by implying that the negative emotions the individual is feeling are unacceptable and feelings of forgiveness is the correct and acceptable way to feel. It might inadvertently promote feelings of shame and contrition within the individual.

Wanda Malcolm, a registered psychologist, states: "that it is not a good idea to make forgiveness an a-priori goal of therapy". Steven Stosny, also adds, that you heal first then forgive (NOT forgive then heal); that fully acknowledging the grievance (both what actions were harmful, and naming the emotions the victim felt as a response to the offenders actions) is an essential first step, before forgiveness can occur.

Some researchers also worry that forgiveness interventions will promote unhealthy relationships. They worry that individuals with toxic relationships will continue to forgive those who continuously commit wrong acts towards them when in fact they should be distancing themselves from these sorts of people.

A number of studies showcase high effectiveness rates of forgiveness interventions when done continuously over a long period of time. Some researchers have found that these interventions have been proven ineffective when done over short spans of time.

Forgiveness interventions: children 
There has been some research within the last decade outlining some studies that have looked at the effectiveness of forgiveness interventions on young children. There have also been several studies done studying this cross culturally. One study that explored this relationship, was a study conducted in 2009 by Eadaoin Hui and Tat Sing Chau. In this study, Hui and Chau looked at the relationship between forgiveness interventions and Chinese children who were less likely to forgive those who had wronged them. The findings of this study showed that there was an effect of forgiveness interventions on the young Chinese children.

Forgiveness interventions: older adults

Older adults that receive forgiveness interventions report higher levels of forgiveness than those that did not receive treatment. Furthermore, forgiveness treatments resulted in lower depression, stress and anger than no treatment conditions. Forgiveness interventions also enhance positive psychological aspects. The specific intervention model (Enright’s or Worthington’s proposal) and format (group or individual) are not associated with better outcomes.

Forgiveness and mental health 
Survey data from 2000 showed that 61% of participants that were part of a small religious group reported that the group helped them be more forgiving. Individuals reported that their religion groups which promote forgiveness was related to self-reports of success in overcoming addictions, guilt, and perceiving encouragement when feeling discouraged.

It is suggested that mindfulness plays a role in forgiveness and health. The forgiveness of others has a positive effect on physical health when it is combined with mindfulness but evidence shows that forgiveness only effects health as a function of mindfulness.

A study from 2005 states that self-forgiveness is an important part of self-acceptance and mental health in later life. The inability to self-forgive can compromise mental health. For some elderly people, self-forgiveness requires reflecting on a transgression to avoid repeating wrongdoings, individuals seek to learn from these transgressions in order to improve their real self-schemas. When individuals are successful at learning from these transgressions, they may experience improved mental health.

A study in 2015 looks at how self-forgiveness can reduce feelings of guilt and shame associated with hypersexual behavior. Hypersexual behaviour can have negative effects on individuals by causing distress and life problems. Self-forgiveness may be a component that can help individuals reduce hypersexual negative behaviours that cause problems.

Evidence shows that self-forgiveness and procrastination may be associated; self-forgiveness allows the individual to overcome the negatives associated with an earlier behaviour and engage in approach-oriented behaviours on a similar task. Learning to forgive oneself for procrastination can be positive because it can promote self-worth and may cause positive mental health. Self-forgiveness for procrastination may also reduce procrastination.

Everett Worthington, Loren Toussaint and David R. Williams, PhD, proclaimed to have enough research on the effects of forgiveness towards mental health and wrote the self-help book Forgiveness and Health: Scientific Evidence and Theories Relating Forgiveness to Better Health detailing the multiple benefits and psychological results of forgiveness to humans mentally and physically. Toussaint and Worthington claim that stress relief can be the chief factor that connects forgiveness and well-being. Toussaint also found that levels of stress went down when levels of forgiveness rose up, resulting in a decrease in mental health symptoms.

Forgiveness gives people a sense that their burden being lifted because they are no longer feeling anger or hatred toward their transgressor. They even begin to understand their transgressor. Since negative emotions and stress are removed from the person seeking forgiveness, overall well-being is improved. They begin to have positive emotions and determinations in life.

Forgiveness and physical health

The correlation between forgiveness and physical health is a concept that has recently gained traction in research. Some studies claim that there is no correlation, either positive or negative between forgiveness and physical health, and others show a positive correlation.

Evidence supporting a correlation
Individuals with forgiveness as a personality trait have been shown to have overall better physical health. In a study on relationships, regardless if someone was in a negative or positive relationship, their physical health seemed to be influenced at least partially by their level of forgiveness.

Individuals who make a decision to genuinely forgive someone are also shown to have better physical health. This is due to the relationship between forgiveness and stress reduction. Forgiveness is seen as preventing poor physical health and managing good physical health.

Specifically individuals who choose to forgive another after a transgression have lower blood pressure and lower cortisol levels than those who do not. This is theorized to be due to various direct and indirect influences of forgiveness, which point to forgiveness as an evolutionary trait. See Broaden and Build Theory.

Direct influences include: Reducing hostility (which is inversely correlated with physical health), and the concept that unforgiveness may reduce the immune system because it puts stress on the individual. Indirect influences are more related to forgiveness as a personality trait and include: forgiving people may have more social support and less stressful marriages, and forgiveness may be related to personality traits that are correlated with physical health.

Forgiveness may also be correlated with physical health because hostility is associated with poor coronary performance. Unforgiveness is as an act of hostility, and forgiveness as an act of letting go of hostility. Heart patients who are treated with therapy that includes forgiveness to reduce hostility have improved cardiac health compared to those who are treated with medicine alone.
	
Forgiveness may also lead to better perceived physical health. This correlation applies to both self-forgiveness and other-forgiveness but is especially true of self-forgiveness. Individuals who are more capable of forgiving themselves have better perceived physical health.

Individuals who partake in forgiving people can sometimes be benefited from the act. For example, people who are willing to forgive others can get healthier hearts, fewer depression symptoms, and less anxiety. Obviously, forgiveness can be seen as somewhat helpful towards mental health especially with people who have mental disorders. Forgiveness can also lead to specific people getting a better immune system.

Criticisms

Forgiveness studies have been refuted by critics who claim that there is no direct correlation between forgiveness and physical health. Forgiveness, due to the reduction of directed anger, contributes to mental health and mental health contributes to physical health, but there is no evidence that forgiveness directly improves physical health. Most of the studies on forgiveness cannot isolate it as an independent variable in an individual's well-being, so it is difficult to prove causation. Further studies imply that while there is not enough research to directly relate forgiveness to physical health there are factors that can be implied. This relates more to physiological measures and what happens to a body during the stages of forgiveness in their daily life.

Additionally, research into the correlation between physical health and forgiveness has been criticized for being too focused on unforgiveness. Research shows more about what hostility and unforgiveness contribute to poor health than it shows what forgiveness contributes to physical health. Additionally, research notes that unforgiving or holding grudges can contribute to adverse health outcomes by perpetuating anger and heightening SNS arousal and cardiovascular reactivity. Expression of anger has been strongly associated with chronically elevated blood pressure and with the aggregation of platelets, which may increase vulnerability for heart disease.

Self-forgiveness 

Self-forgiveness happens in situations where an individual has done something that they perceive to be morally wrong and they consider themselves to be responsible for the wrongdoing. Self-forgiveness is the overcoming of negative emotions that the wrongdoer associates with the wrongful action. Negative emotions associated with wrongful action can include guilt, regret, remorse, blame, shame, self-hatred and/or self-contempt.

Major life events that include trauma can cause individuals to experience feelings of guilt or self-hatred. Humans have the ability to reflect on their behaviours to determine if their actions are moral. In situations of trauma, humans can choose to self-forgive by allowing themselves to change and live a moral life. Self-forgiveness may be required in situations where the individual hurt themselves or in situations where they hurt others. Indeed, self-forgiveness has been shown to have a moderating effect between depression and suicidality: suggesting self-forgiveness (up-to a point) as not only a protective factor of suicide, but also hinting at possible prevention strategies.

Therapeutic model
Individuals can unintentionally cause harm or offence to one another in everyday life. It is important for individuals to be able to recognize when this happens, and in the process of making amends, have the ability to self-forgive. Specific research suggests that the ability to genuinely forgive one's self can be significantly beneficial to an individual's emotional as well as mental well-being. The research indicates that the ability to forgive one's self for past offences can lead to decreased feelings of negative emotions such as shame and guilt, and can increase the use of more positive practices such as self-kindness and self-compassion. However, it has been indicated that it is possible for the process of self-forgiveness to be misinterpreted and therefore not accurately completed. This could potentially lead to increased feelings of regret or self-blame. In an attempt to avoid this, and increase the positive benefits associated with genuine self-forgiveness, a specific therapeutic model of self-forgiveness has been recommended, which can be used to encourage genuine self-forgiveness in offenders. The model that has been proposed has four key elements. These elements include responsibility, remorse, restoration and renewal. 
 The therapeutic model suggests responsibility as the first necessary step towards genuine self-forgiveness. Research advises that in order to avoid the negative affect associated with emotions such as overwhelming guilt or regret, offenders must first recognize that they have hurt another individual, and accept the responsibility necessary for their actions. 
 Once the individual has accepted responsibility for their offences, it is natural for them to experience feelings of remorse or guilt. However, these feelings can be genuinely processed and expressed preceding the need for restoration. 
 The act of restoration allows the offending individual to make the necessary amends to the individual(s) they have hurt.
 The final component in the model of self-forgiveness is renewal'. The offending individual is able to genuinely forgive himself/herself for their past transgressions and can engage in more positive and meaningful behaviors such as self-compassion and self-kindness. 
Despite the suggested model, research advises that the process of self-forgiveness is not always applicable for every individual. For example, individuals who have not actually caused others any harm or wrongdoing, but instead are suffering from negative emotions such as self-hatred or self-pity, such as victims of assault, might attempt self-forgiveness for their perceived offences. However, this would not be the process necessary for them to make their amends. Additionally, offenders who continue to offend others while attempting to forgive themselves for past offences demonstrate a reluctance to genuinely complete the four stages necessary for self-forgiveness. Research suggests that it is important to first gather exterior information about the individual's perceived offences as well as their needs and motivation for self-forgiveness.

Unapologetic forgiveness 
Being unapologetic is often something that humans come across at some point in their lives, and there has been much research on if a person refuses to apologize or even recognized the wrongdoings. This can then often lead into how one would go into forgiving the unapologetic party and "the relationship between apologies and the adjectives 'apologetic' and 'unapologetic' is not quite so straightforward." People struggle with forgiving people that have done wrongful actions. Causing a person to not forgive themselves or another. It relates to how people feel about the person who is asking for forgiveness. Choosing to forgive someone or not correlates to whether that person is truly sorry for their actions or not. Forgiving a person who does not seem remorseful for their actions can be difficult, but may loosen the grip the person has over you. Intrusive thoughts can cause the person who wants to forgive, to have feelings of low self-worth, and endure a traumatic phase due to that person's actions. Going through a negative experience in your life can cause long term trauma. It can stay in your memory just like a good one. A bad experience will be there too. Holding on to negative emotion is the driving fuel of why people may struggle to heal from their problems in their mind. Having thoughts of revenge may not help a person to heal from the past experience that led them to harbor those negative emotions. They may benefit from letting go and accepting what has happened. Letting go does not erase what the person did, but forgiveness can lead to inner-peace from the lack of negative emotion within. Despite the other person not apologizing sincerely, forgiving them may be the solution to problems and result in loving one's self.

Character retributivism 

 Forgiveness could be offered only at significant temporal remove from the wrongdoing.
 The enforcement of justice, at least with regard to punishing or rewarding, falls outside the purview of personal forgiveness.
 Forgiveness operates at a different level than justice.

Jean Hampton 
Jean Hampton sees the decision to forgive the unrepentant wrongdoer as expressing a commitment "to see a wrongdoer in a new, more favorable light" as one who is not completely rotten or morally dead.

See also 

 A Course in Miracles
 Anantarika-karma
 Clementia, Roman goddess of forgiveness (and Eleos, her Greek counterpart)
 Compassion
 Contrition
 Ethics in religion
 Ho'oponopono
 Letter of Reconciliation of the Polish Bishops to the German Bishops
 Pardon
 Regret
 Relational transgressions
 Remorse
 Repentance
 Resentment
 Truth and Reconciliation Commission
 Unconditional love

References

Citations

Bibliography 
 Randall J. Cecrle, Balancing the Scales of Justices with Forgiveness and Repentance, 2007, 
 Susan Forward, Toxic Parents: Overcoming Their Hurtful Legacy and Reclaiming Your Life, 1990
 Charles Griswold, Forgiveness: a Philosophical Exploration, Cambridge University Press, 2007, .
 David Konstan, Before Forgiveness: The Origins of a Moral Idea (Cambridge/New York: Cambridge University Press, 2010).
 J. Kramer, and D. Alstad, The Guru Papers: Masks of Authoritarian Power, 1993, 
 K. Lampert, Traditions of Compassion: From Religious Duty to Social Activism. Palgrave-Macmillan 2005, 
 Eric Lomax, The Railway Man: A POW's Searing Account of War, Brutality, and Forgiveness
 Fred Luskin, Forgive for Good: A Proven Prescription for Health and Happiness (Harper, 2002)
 G. Marcus, The Power of Forgiveness, 2011, Sapients.Net
 J. Murphy, and J. Hampton, Forgiveness and Mercy (Cambridge University Press, 1988).
 K. Norlock, Forgiveness from a Feminist Perspective (Lexington Books, 2009.
 G. Pettigrove, Forgiveness and Love (Oxford University Press, 2012).
 Jeanne Safer, Forgiving and Not Forgiving: Why Sometimes It's Better Not to Forgive, 2000, 
 D. Schmidt D. The Prayer of Revenge: Forgiveness in the Face of Injustice, 2003 
 Colin Tipping, Radical Forgiveness: Making Room for the Miracle, 1997,

External links 

 
 
Forgiveness Leads To Light, Love And A Joyful Life

Virtue
Kindness
Philosophy of love
Religious practices
Religious ethics
Spirituality
Emotions
Mythology
Moral psychology